Dinitolmide (or zoalene) is a fodder additive for poultry, used to prevent coccidiosis infections. It is sold under trade names such as Coccidine A, Coccidot, and Zoamix. 

Dinitolmide is usually added to feed in doses of 125 ppm (preventive) or 250 ppm (curative). It is a broad-spectrum anticoccidial drug, preventing seven main strains of Eimeria coccidium. It leaves no residues in tissues. It can be also used to prevent coccidiosis of domestic rabbits.

References

External links
 Zoamix - DailyMed

Nitrobenzenes
Poultry farming
Benzamides